Pundi railway station (station code:PUN) is located in the Indian state of Andhra Pradesh. It serves Pundi, Vajrapukotturu and surrounding areas in Srikakulam district.

It is a major hub for regions around Vajrapukotturu. It is situated in Pundi, a village in Srikakulam district in Andhra Pradesh.

Amenities 
This station has a First Class Waiting Hall, computerised reservation offices, II class waiting room, footbridge, and a Public Address System. A computerized reservation counter is available from 08:00 hrs to 20:00 hrs.

This station has 3 platforms.

References

Railway stations in Srikakulam district